Agapeta is a genus of moths belonging to the subfamily Tortricinae of the family Tortricidae.

Species
Agapeta angelana (Kennel, 1919)
Agapeta hamana (Linnaeus, 1758)
Agapeta largana (Rebel, 1906)
Agapeta zoegana (Linnaeus, 1767) – knapweed root-borer moth

See also
List of Tortricidae genera

References

 , 2005: World Catalogue of Insects volume 5 Tortricidae.
 , 1822, Syst.-alphab. Verz. 58.
 , 2011: Diagnoses and remarks on genera of Tortricidae, 2: Cochylini (Lepidoptera: Tortricidae). Shilap Revista de Lepidopterologia 39 (156): 397-414.

External links
 tortricidae.com

Cochylini
Tortricidae genera
Taxa named by Jacob Hübner